F82 or F-82 may refer to :

 North American F-82 Twin Mustang, a 1945 American piston engine fighter
 , a Royal Navy Tribal-class destroyer, 1938–1942
 , a Royal Navy Type 23 frigate, launched 1994
 , formerly U82, a Royal Navy Black Swan-class sloop 1943–1959
 , a passenger and cargo ship in Royal Navy service 1940–1946
  (F82), a Santa Maria-class frigate, launched 1986
 F82, a version of the BMW M4 car